Ashley Gjøvik (born ) is an American program manager and activist who is known for her whistleblowing and labor complaints against Apple Inc. After she raised issues with the alleged mishandling of environmental concerns, employee privacy, harassment, and discrimination at Apple in 2021, she was terminated by the company for allegedly leaking confidential intellectual property, which Gjøvik denies, alleging her firing was retaliation for speaking out against the company. 

Gjøvik filed numerous complaints against Apple across the United States and Europe during 2021 and 2022, which as of December 2021 and April 2022, were being investigated by the respective parties for merit.  In January 2023, the US NLRB ruled that Apple's confidentiality rules violate workers' rights to speak with the media and each other regarding pay and working conditions, but did not yet rule on allegations regarding her dismissal.

Education and career 
Gjøvik completed a Bachelor of Science in Liberal Studies from Portland State University in 2012, and earned a Project Management Professional certification in 2013.

Following working for Nike, Inc., Gjøvik began working at Apple in 2015, and remained there until September 2021, by which time she had become a senior engineering program manager working out of their Sunnyvale, California, office. While working at Apple, Gjøvik also studied transitional justice at University of Oxford and began a Juris Doctor degree at Santa Clara University law school. She also worked with a law group that helps asylum seekers, and has published writing about public health, privacy, and human rights.

Apple complaints 

After raising concerns internally with Apple, Gjøvik began speaking openly on Twitter and to press. Her allegations against Apple include mishandling of environmental concerns, violations of employee privacy, harassment, and retaliation. Her allegations were under investigation as of December 2021. Gjøvik said she made $386,000 in 2021 prior to her termination, and is asking for reinstatement if the agencies find that Apple fired her unlawfully.

Environmental health and safety concerns 

In 2020, Gjøvik raised concerns about the safety of her Santa Clara, California, apartment complex. She wrote an essay for the San Francisco Bay View describing a debilitating mystery illness that felt terminal, which she attributed to exposure to volatile organic compounds (VOCs) in the ground through a process called "vapor intrusion" into the building. She said the symptoms started right after she moved in, and stopped immediately after moving out.

On March 17, 2021, Gjøvik received an email from Apple's environmental health and safety team notifying staff of forthcoming vapor intrusion testing at the Sunnyvale office building, which she said sent off "alarm bells" due to her health issues at the apartment building. She asked the team what type of testing had been done in the previous six years, and says she was told not to discuss her concerns with other employees and was subsequently harassed and humiliated. Gjøvik said she had fainted at work and did not know why, and that this had contributed to her concerns that Apple had not properly tested the site for contaminants. She also believed Apple had not sufficiently informed employees of the possible health issue from "chemical exposure". She says she was told there was no legal requirement.

The building, Stewart 1, leased by Apple in 2015, is located on a Superfund site managed by Northrop Grumman called TRW Microwave, where toxic waste had been previously disposed of and leaked into the soil.  The main compound of concern is trichloroethylene (TCE), a known carcinogen. During the 1980s and through 2008, the area was one of many in Silicon Valley to undergo a massive cleanup project. In 1994, a public health study concluded that groundwater was contaminated, which can lead to vapor intrusion. The EPA says the site has institutional controls to protect people from contact with affected water. Drinking water in the area comes from Hetch Hetchy and municipal wells. In 2014, following a failed vapor intrusion test, the EPA implemented new notification requirements to quickly mitigate unacceptable levels. Indoor air sampling confirmed the effectiveness of the remedies, before the site was occupied. A study in 2019 determined the issues had been addressed, but in 2021, employees were exposed to carcinogenic fumes through cracks in the floor.

Gjøvik ultimately filed complaints with the EPA and the National Labor Relations Board (NLRB). She also filed an Occupational Safety and Health Administration (OSHA) whistleblower complaint with the United States Department of Labor (DOL). As of December 2021, OSHA was investigating the retaliation complaint.

Gjøvik said that when she asked Apple's employee relations team what options there were for her health-related concerns prior to the company-mandated return-to-office plans during the COVID-19 pandemic, the representative suggested she file an Americans with Disabilities Act of 1990 (ADA) accommodations request to continue working remotely. She said she had "serious concerns about [the] workplace safety of my building and Apple's other buildings on chemical release sites", but filed the request because it was the only option she was given. She said she was given a medical release form to fill out to allow Apple to access her medical records. Gjøvik said she refused to fill it out unless only Sedgwick, the claims processor, was given access to her medical records. Gjøvik never received the accommodation.

Employee privacy concerns 
Gjøvik has spoken publicly about privacy concerns as an Apple employee. In 2018, Gjøvik's engineering team was involved in a lawsuit, and because she had worked on a project that was relevant to the lawsuit, lawyers requested files from her phone and computer and told her not to delete any files. Gjøvik said her team had recommended against keeping separate phones for her personal and professional use, a practice that other Apple employees also said was commonplace. Gjøvik had personal documents on the phone, including nude photographs, and when she asked if she could delete the photographs, she said the lawyers said no.  

"Glimmer", formerly known as "Gobbler", was an internal tool that was created to test Apple's Face ID software before its 2017 launch. The app took photos and brief videos when it sensed a face. Gjøvik described the app as "spyware", saying, "It was taking photos of me in my home, in my bathroom, in bed, anywhere I had my phone... And it stored these photos somewhere and uploads them sometimes to some place—[Apple] didn't tell us much". Gjøvik had signed an informed consent form before the app was installed, though Gjøvik and other Apple staff have alleged that agreeing to help test software like Glimmer on company-owned devices was expected of them, with Gjøvik referring to the practice as a "loyalty test". Uploads containing photos or other sensitive data was done manually by employees. Some non-sensitive data was uploaded automatically unless employees turned it off. 

Gjøvik spoke to press about her concerns pertaining to data privacy with an internal bug tracking tool called "Radar", which stores reports indefinitely and has broad defaults for employee access. Apple instructs its employees not to upload sensitive, confidential, or private data to work tools like Radar. Gjøvik filed a bug report in 2019 about Apple's photo search software returning "a selfie I took of myself in bed after laparoscopic surgery to treat my endometriosis" when she entered the search term "infant". The report could not be subsequently removed, and the default sharing settings allowed Apple's entire software engineering team to view the details of the report.

In September 2021, Gjøvik criticized Apple's employee privacy policy, which she says states that workers have no expectation of privacy when using a personal device for Apple business. She says the implication of possible employee surveillance under the policies led her to walk around her apartment and unplug all of her electronics and remove all of her personal information off of Apple's servers.

In April 2022, she brought her complaints to the United Kingdom, lodging a complaint with the Data Protection Information Commissioner’s Office (ICO). She also brought the complaint to ICO's counterpart in Brussels, the Data Protection Commissioner in Ireland, and the non-profit privacy protection organization Big Brother Watch. The ICO said they are assessing the concerns, which allege unlawful data collection and invasion of employee privacy, raised by Gjøvik.

Harassment and discrimination 

Gjøvik has alleged that Apple pressured her into revealing details of sexual harassment she had experienced after she mentioned the incident in an unrelated meeting with a member of Apple's human resources department. She said that Apple took no action related to her report except to reveal her to the employee she had accused. Gjøvik also complained to Apple about sex discrimination from a male manager, and Apple closed an investigation into the incident finding no wrongdoing. Following the closure of the investigation, she wrote on Twitter about the experience on August 2, 2021, "Wanted to share: #Apple employee relations confirmed this #tonepolicing is totally ok feedback for me to get from my #bigtech #male leaders & not #sexist. As this investigation rolls on, I've decided to start Tweeting the stuff they say is 'ok.' I mean, they did say it was ok?" In the tweet, she attached a screenshot of feedback from a manager who wrote that he "didn't hear you going up an octave at the end of your statements" and that she "came across as much more authoritative". Apple opened a second investigation into the allegations in August 2021, and she was placed on paid administrative leave. Apple has said they "don't discuss any individual employee matters, out of respect for the privacy of the people involved", and "are and have always been deeply committed to creating and maintaining a positive and inclusive workplace," and they "take all concerns seriously" and "thoroughly investigate whenever a concern is raised."

Administrative leave and firing 

Gjøvik alleges that after raising concerns internally and speaking publicly about her concerns with Apple, she was retaliated against repeatedly, and was reassigned. On August 4, 2021, Apple placed her on indefinite paid administrative leave for the duration of the investigation, which she said she requested as a "last resort", and which she later described as "forced" and as a "suspension" in her complaint filed with OSHA. Gjøvik subsequently filed additional various complaints about Apple with the U.S. Department of Labor's OSHA, the California Department of Fair Employment and Housing (DFEH), the Equal Employment Opportunity Commission (EEOC), and the United States Department of Justice. Both the DFEH and EEOC issued Gjøvik right to sue letters, which enable her to file discrimination lawsuits at the state or federal level.

On August 26, 2021, Gjøvik filed a charge with the NLRB, alleging retaliation as well as harassment by a manager and forced administrative leave. In October 2021, Gjøvik filed a whistleblower complaint with the U.S. Securities and Exchange Commission (SEC) about alleged false statements by Apple to the SEC, pertaining to Apple's no-action letter filed earlier that month stating that their "policy is not to use [concealment] clauses". Cher Scarlett also filed a whistleblower complaint with the SEC about the no-action letter, providing the agency with a post-employment contract she was offered earlier that month. The no-action filing was subsequently denied by the SEC.

On September 9, 2021, a member of Apple's human resources team contacted her, asking to speak about "a sensitive Intellectual Property matter". Gjøvik replied that she would speak to them, but that the conversation would need to be captured in writing, and she would forward it to the NLRB. Apple replied, "Since you have chosen not to participate in the discussion... we will move forward with the information that we have" and suspended her employee access. She was formally fired in a third email later that day which stated she had "engaged in conduct that warrants termination of employment, including, but not limited to, violations of Apple policies". The violations claimed by Apple were that she had "disclosed confidential product-related information in violation of Apple policies" and that she had "failed to cooperate and to provide accurate and complete information during the Apple investigatory process". Gjøvik has denied these allegations, referring to the termination as retaliation for speaking out and filing complaints about the company with multiple agencies. She later filed additional charges with the NLRB and the United States Department of Labor for retaliation, which are being investigated by the respective parties. 

Gjøvik had previously posted on Twitter a photograph of herself that had been taken by Glimmer, and screenshots of an email that asked her to volunteer to have her ears 3D-scanned to aid in AirPods development. On September 15, 2021, she was asked to remove the two tweets in an email from the O'Melveny & Myers law firm, on behalf of Apple. The email claimed the tweets were violating a confidentiality agreement she had signed when she first joined the company. Gjøvik complied with the request to remove the tweets, though in communications via a lawyer to Apple she argued that the material she had shared was not labeled confidential and did not contain anything secret or proprietary, and that the photograph of her could not reasonably be argued to be copyrighted by Apple.

Following her termination and subsequent retaliation charges, Gjøvik filed an additional charge with the NLRB against Apple in October 2021 following news of a company-wide memo from Tim Cook sent to employees on September 21, 2021. The memo was criticized for conflating product leaks with employee activism around workplace conditions, and for including the line, "people who leak confidential information do not belong here," which some interpreted as threatening. Gjøvik alleged that the memo violated the National Labor Relations Act of 1935 in her charge, and additionally challenged several policies in the employee handbook that she said illegally inhibit staff from exercising their federally-protected rights to talk to the press, discuss wages, and post on social media. She, and some other legal professionals, believe that this particular charge, if prosecuted, could overturn a "Trump Era" precedent governing workplace policies involving Boeing from December 2017, which weigh employee rights against legitimate business interests. She also said she hopes to disrupt the company's culture of secrecy. 

On January 30, 2022, the NLRB found that “various work rules, handbook rules, and confidentiality rules” imposed by Apple and its executives “tend to interfere with, restrain or coerce employees” from exercising their legal rights to collective action and to speak with the media.  The NLRB has not yet ruled in response to Gjøvik's individual charges.

See also 

 Apple worker organizations
 Frances Haugen, former Facebook product manager and Facebook files whistleblowe
 Timnit Gebru, former Google computer scientist and whistleblower
 Ifeoma Ozoma, former Pinterest policy specialis and whistleblower
Rebekah Jones, former Florida Department of Health data scientist and whistleblower

References

External links 
 
 
 Ashley Gjøvik on Substack

1980s births
21st-century American women writers
21st-century American writers
American whistleblowers
Apple Inc. employees
Living people
Portland State University alumni
Workers' rights activists
Year of birth missing (living people)